Deacon Blackfire is a supervillain appearing in American comic books published by DC Comics. Blackfire is stated as being over 100 years old, and is often portrayed as a power-crazed charismatic con artist and cult leader skilled in manipulation and brainwashing. Blackfire claimed to be a Native American shaman who was entombed alive after being found guilty of killing a tribal chief and committing heresy.

Publication history
He first appeared in Batman: The Cult #1 (1988) and was created by Jim Starlin and Bernie Wrightson.

Fictional character biography
Deacon Blackfire is the main antagonist in the four-issue miniseries, Batman: The Cult. Blackfire is a con man and cult leader who may be over 100 years old. He forms an army in the sewers beneath Gotham City, largely composed of the homeless. Blackfire uses this army to begin a violent war on crime, which escalates into him taking over the entire city, resulting in it being isolated from the rest of the country. Blackfire captures and brainwashes Batman, temporarily making the Caped Crusader a member of Blackfire's cult, during which Batman breaks his cardinal rule of not killing. Batman eventually breaks his conditioning, but its aftereffects make it difficult for him to capture Blackfire. After a brutal search through the sewers, Batman confronts Blackfire, who demands that Batman kill him, making him a martyr. Batman refuses, and instead savagely beats Blackfire in front of his army. Blackfire's army turns on him and rips him to shreds.

As part of the Blackest Night event, Blackfire's corpse is reanimated by a black power ring and recruited to the Black Lantern Corps in Blackest Night: Batman #1 (October 2009).

In The New 52 reboot, Deacon Blackfire is an evangelist who is the center of the occult power permeating Arkham Asylum, with the Joker's Daughter as his enforcer. When Batwing and the Spectre (as Jim Corrigan) uncover the secret of the asylum, both are captured by Blackfire and his demonic army. In the same issue, flashbacks are shown of the previous time Batman encountered the Deacon. The Deacon had an army of devoted homeless and underprivileged, but he also kept many of them drugged and under his control. He attempted to do the same with Batman, keeping him chained and drugged in his basement for seven days and seven nights, but the Dark Knight's resiliency led to the Deacon ordering his devotees to kill him. Batman, however, brought up the question of why Deacon Blackfire would not kill him himself, if he was as powerful as he wanted his army to believe. Batman is able to break the pipe that he is chained to, and in a reversal of their confrontation in Batman: The Cult, orders the Deacon to kill him to prove himself in front of his followers. Deacon Blackfire refuses multiple times, and his disillusioned army turns on him and appears to beat him to death.

Between their first encounter and the time of Eternal, the Deacon has taken over the body of Maxie Zeus, in attempt to regain entry into this world.
The ghost of Deacon Blackfire returns in DC Rebirth, attempting to possess his only remaining blood relative as a means of resurrection.

Powers and abilities
Deacon Blackfire has mind-control abilities. He also has an extended lifespan.

In other media
Deacon Blackfire appears in Batman: Arkham Knight, voiced by Marc Worden.

References

External links
 Deacon Blackfire at DC Comics Wiki
 Deacon Blackfire at Comic Vine

Comics characters introduced in 1988
Characters created by Jim Starlin
DC Comics supervillains
Fictional cult leaders
Fictional con artists
Fictional hypnotists and indoctrinators
Fictional shamans
Fictional characters with slowed ageing